Damien Memorial School is a private Roman Catholic preparatory school for boys and girls in grades 6–12 in Kalihi, Honolulu, Hawaii, United States.  Located in the Roman Catholic Diocese of Honolulu, the school is sponsored by the Congregation of Christian Brothers and is accredited by the Western Association of Schools and Colleges.

History and origins 
At the end of World War II, the Catholic Diocese of Honolulu saw the need for a second Catholic school on Oahu. The new school was named after Saint Damien de Veuster, who devoted his life to caring for Hansen's Disease patients on Molokai during the 19th century. The Congregation of Christian Brothers, parents and students volunteered to turn the land - which included  of taro patches and a good deal of uneven swampland - into a school campus because the company that started construction on Damien went bankrupt. Damien became coeducational beginning from the 2012–13 school year.

Athletics 

Damien, in its 60 years of athletic competition, has primarily played within Division II. As recently as the 2021-2022 season, Damien's Varsity Boys Baseball Team had emerged as Division II State Champions, representing the Interscholastic League of Honolulu and winning the ILH their third consecutive state championship.

Damien Alma Mater 
Damien Alma Mater

Tender True and Bold

Proudly in the Heavens

Gleams thy Mauve and Gold

Glory's mantle cloaks thee

God our guide is nigh 

And our hearts forever love thee Damien High

And our hearts forever praise thee Damien High!

Notable alumni
Frank De Lima, comedian
Joe DeSa, MLB first baseman
Kealoha Pilares, NFL player
Chris Truby, MLB third baseman
Inoke Breckterfield, University of Wisconsin defensive line coach
Jacob Batalon, actor
Dr. Arnold Laanui, former FBI Secret Agent and current President/CEO of Damien
Billy "Taz" Sullivan, Lt. Col. USAF F15c Fighter Pilot

References

Roman Catholic Diocese of Honolulu
Private high schools in Honolulu
Private middle schools in Hawaii
Private schools in Honolulu
Congregation of Christian Brothers secondary schools
Catholic secondary schools in Hawaii
Educational institutions established in 1962
1962 establishments in Hawaii